Bakonynána is a village in Veszprém county, Hungary in Zirc District.

In 1559 it was property of Mihály Cseszneky.

References
 Szíj Rezső: Várpalota
 Fejér megyei történeti évkönyv
 Hofkammerarchiv Wien
 Dudar története

Populated places in Zirc District